Old-school hip hop (also spelled old skool) is the earliest commercially recorded hip hop music and original style of the genre. It typically refers to the music created around 1979 to 1983, as well as any hip hop that does not adhere to contemporary styles.

The image, styles and sounds of old-school hip hop were exemplified by figures like Grandmaster Flowers, Grand Wizzard Theodore, Grandmaster Flash, Afrika Bambaataa, DJ Kool Herc, Treacherous Three, Funky Four Plus One, Kurtis Blow, The Sugarhill Gang, Melle Mel, Super-Wolf, West Street Mob, Spoonie Gee, Kool Moe Dee, Busy Bee Starski, Lovebug Starski, DJ Hollywood, The Cold Crush Brothers, Warp 9, T-Ski Valley, Grandmaster Caz, Doug E. Fresh, The Sequence, Jazzy Jay, Rock Steady Crew, and Fab Five Freddy.

It is characterized by the simpler rapping techniques of the time and the general focus on party-related subject matter. The lyrics were usually not a very important part of old-school rap songs. There were, however, exceptions such as Brother D's "How We Gonna Make the Black Nation Rise?" and Kurtis Blow's "Hard Times" (both released in 1980), that explored socially relevant ideas. The release of "The Message" in 1982, written by Duke Bootee and Melle Mel and credited to Grandmaster Flash and The Furious Five, marked the arrival of hip hop as social commentary, making it possible for future artists like Public Enemy and N.W.A to create an identity based on socially conscious themes in later years. Old-school rappers are widely respected by current hip hop artists and fans, with many claiming they have contributed to the evolution of hip hop.

Musical characteristics and themes
Old-school hip hop is noted for its relatively simple rapping techniques, compared to later hip hop music. Artists such as Melle Mel would use few syllables per bar of music, with simple rhythms and a moderate tempo.

Much of the subject matter of old-school hip hop centers around partying and having a good time. In the book How to Rap, Immortal Technique explains how party content played a big part in old-school hip hop: "hip-hop was born in an era of social turmoil... in the same way that slaves used to sing songs on a plantation... that's the party songs that we used to have".

Battle rap was also a part of the old-school hip hop aesthetic. While discussing battle rapping, Esoteric said, "a lot of my stuff stems from old school hip-hop, braggadocio ethic". A famous old-school hip hop battle occurred in December 1981, when Kool Moe Dee challenged Busy Bee Starski. Busy Bee Starski's defeat by the more complex raps of Kool Moe Dee meant that "no longer was an MC just a crowd-pleasing comedian with a slick tongue; he was a commentator and a storyteller". in the documentary Beef, KRS-One also credits this as creating a shift in rapping.

Sci-fi/Afrofuturism was another theme introduced into hip hop. The release of Planet Rock in 1982 was a game-changer, like "a light being switched on." The combination of electronic percussive propulsion and Afrika Bambaataa's rap sounded like "an orchestra being rocketed into outer space." "Light Years Away", by Warp 9 (1983), produced and written by Lotti Golden and Richard Scher, explored social commentary from a sci-fi perspective. A "cornerstone of early 80's beatbox afrofuturism", "Light Years Away" is characterized as "a brilliantly spare and sparse piece of electro hip-hop traversing inner and outer space."

Freestyle rap during hip hop's old-school era was defined differently than it is today. Kool Moe Dee refers to this earlier definition in his book There's a God on the Mic: "There are two types of freestyle. There's an old-school freestyle that's basically rhymes that you've written that may not have anything to do with any subject or that goes all over the place. Then there's freestyle where you come off the top of the head". In old-school hip hop, Kool Moe Dee says that improvisational rapping was instead called "coming off the top of the head". He refers to this as "the real old-school freestyle". This is in contrast to the more recent definition defining freestyle rap as "improvisational rap like a jazz solo".

Old-school hip hop often sampled disco and funk tracks, such as "Good Times" by Chic, when performed live in the 1970s. Recorded hip hop (such as Sugarhill Gang's "Rapper's Delight") would use a live band to do covers of the famous breaks from the 1970s block parties. However, after "Planet Rock", electro-funk (the electronic Roland TR-808 drum machine recreation of the original 1970s breakbeat sound from the now infamous block parties) became the staple production technique between 1982 and 1986 (the invention of the sampler later in the 80s and Eric B. & Rakim's "Eric B. Is President" brought the original 1970s break beat sound back to hip hop, referred to today as the "boom bap" sound). The use of extended percussion breaks led to the development of mixing and scratching techniques. Scratching was pioneered by Grand Wizard Theodore in 1975, and the technique was further developed by other prominent DJs, such as Grandmaster Flash. One example is "Adventures on the Wheels of Steel", which was composed entirely by Flash on the turntables.

Quincy Jones was an influential figure in hip hop as a record producer for Mercury Records, and eventually became its vice president, which made him popular in hip hop culture. He went on to publish Vibe magazine, which became a cornerstone in hip hop history.

History
Old-school hip hop typically refers to music created around 1980; however, the term may also be applied to music before this with hip-hop styles. "Here Comes the Judge" (1968) by Pigmeat Markham is often referred to as "old-school hip hop".

See also
 R&B
 Funk
 Soul music
 Disco
 James Brown
 South Bronx

References

History of hip hop
American hip hop
1980s in music
African-American music
African-American culture
1970s in music
1970s in New York City
1960s in music